The sponge iron reaction (SIR) is a chemical process based on redox cycling of an iron-based contact mass, the first cycle is a conversion step between iron metal (Fe) and wuestite (FeO), the second cycle is a conversion step between wuestite (FeO) and magnetite (Fe3O4). In application, the SIT is used in the reformer sponge iron cycle (RESC) in combination with a steam reforming unit.

Process description
The process has two modes, a reduction mode and an oxidation mode.

Iron-wuestite         
 +  ↔  +

Magnetite-wuestite   
 +  ↔ 3 +

Application
The reformer sponge iron cycle is a two step cycle to produce hydrogen from hydrocarbon fuels based SIR and steam.

Reformer sponge iron cycle
In the first step the hydrocarbon fuel is reformed to syngas in the reformer which is then used to reduce the iron oxide (magnetite—Fe3O4) to iron (wüstite—FeO), in the second step steam is utilized to re-oxidise the iron into magnetite and hydrogen. The iron oxide pellets are placed in a pelletbed and have a service life of several thousand redox cycles.

See also
Packed bed
Steam reforming

References

External links
A thermodynamic analysis of the reformer sponge iron cycle
Investigations on mixed CO2- and steam reforming of liquid hydrocarbons for the decentralized production of hydrogen
Solid biomass gasification for fuel cells (sponge iron reactor SIR)

Chemical processes
Hydrogen production